Vítězslav Bílek (born July 31, 1983 in Tábor) is a Czech professional ice hockey player. He played with Rytíři Kladno in the Czech Extraliga during the 2010–11 Czech Extraliga season.

Career statistics

References

External links

1983 births
Czech ice hockey forwards
Beibarys Atyrau players
HC Karlovy Vary players
HC Slavia Praha players
HC Sparta Praha players
HC Stadion Litoměřice players
MHC Martin players
Motor České Budějovice players
Oulun Kärpät players
Rytíři Kladno players
Sportovní Klub Kadaň players
Starbulls Rosenheim players
Living people
People from Tábor
Sportspeople from the South Bohemian Region
Czech expatriate sportspeople in Slovakia
Czech expatriate ice hockey players in Germany
Czech expatriate ice hockey players in Finland
Czech expatriate sportspeople in Kazakhstan
Expatriate ice hockey players in Kazakhstan